Dennis Bilde (born 11 December 1989) is a Danish bridge player.

Bridge accomplishments

Wins

 North American Bridge Championships (5)
 Keohane North American Swiss Teams (1) 2012 
 Reisinger (1) 2019 
 Silodor Open Pairs (1) 2012 
 Vanderbilt (1) 2013 
Norman Kay Platinum Pairs (1) 2017
Roth Open Swiss Teams (1) 2022

Runners-up

References

External links
 
 

Danish contract bridge players
Living people
1989 births